The Constant Factor is a 1980 Polish film directed by Krzysztof Zanussi. It tells the story of a young man struggling to face the death of his mother and harbouring a desire to climb the Himalayas as his father had done.

The film won the Jury Prize and the Prize of the Ecumenical Jury at the 1980 Cannes Film Festival.

Plot 
Witold, a graduate of the electrical technical school, participates in high-mountain climbing during his military service. One of the mountaineers at the shelter mentions father Witold, who once died during a mountain expedition. Thanks to the business card received from this mountaineer, Witek, after completing his military service, gets a job in an exhibition organization company. Thanks to this, he can go on business to India. While visiting the country, he notices that his boss, Mariusz, is committing fraudulent visa settlements. 

Soon, due to his mother's sudden illness, Witold goes to a provincial town. In the local hospital, he finds her on a bed set in the corridor due to the lack of places. He intervenes in this case unsuccessfully, and nurse Grażyna informs her that a bribe should have been paid. The terminally ill mother of Witold returns home and then dies. Unable to shake off his mother's death, Witold, in an act of defiance, rebels against Mariusz when the latter, on his next business trip, offers him to take part in the transaction machinations, for which he is later harassed by his colleagues, who are convicted with his boss. As Witold, together with his military colleague Stefan, is preparing for the planned trip to the Himalayas, Mariusz's subordinates frame Witold, who realizes at the customs clearance that an undeclared amount of two hundred dollars has been found with him.

Witold loses his job, and the only person who stays close to him is Grażyna. Witold earns his living as a window cleaner in skyscrapers and scaffolding during the renovation of monuments. As a free student, he participates in lectures on mathematics at the Polytechnic. Although the professor encourages Witold to undertake regular studies, he is skeptical about the proposal. When one day it bruises a crumbling facade on a scaffolding, a small child chasing a ball is hit with pieces of debris. The film ends with a scream from Witold.

Cast
 Tadeusz Bradecki – Witold
 Zofia Mrozowska – Witold's Mother
 Malgorzata Zajaczkowska – Grazyna
 Cezary Morawski – Stefan
 Witold Pyrkosz – Mariusz
 Ewa Lejczak – Stefan's Wife
 Jan Jurewicz – Zenek
 Juliusz Machulski – Wladek
 Marek Litewka – Wlodzimierz
 Jacek Strzemzalski – Mate
 Edward Zebrowski – Scientist

References

External links 
 
 

Polish drama films
1980 films
Films directed by Krzysztof Zanussi
Films scored by Wojciech Kilar
1980s Polish-language films
1980 drama films